Sofronov may refer to:

People
Anatoly Sofronov (1911–1990), Soviet Russian writer, poet, playwright, scriptwriter, editor
Georgy Sofronov (1893–1973), Soviet general

Places
Sofronovo, Melenkovsky District, Vladimir Oblast, Russia
Sofronovo, Nikolsky District, Vologda Oblast, Russia
Sofronovo, Vashkinsky District, Vologda Oblast, Russia

See also
Safronov (disambiguation)
Sofronovo (disambiguation)